Arthur Edward Lowdell (7 November 1897 – 1979) was an English footballer who played for Ton Pentre, Sheffield Wednesday and Tottenham Hotspur.

Football career 
Lowdell began his career at Welsh non League club Ton Pentre. In 1921 the right half joined Sheffield Wednesday and went on to make 108 appearances and score six goals. Lowdell joined Tottenham Hotspur in the summer of 1927. He made his debut at White Hart Lane against Birmingham City on 27 August 1927. Lowdell featured in 90 matches  in all competitions for the Lilywhites and was made captain of the club in 1928–29.

After football 
Lowdell spent the later years of his life living at Canvey Island, Essex.

References 

1897 births
1979 deaths
People from Edmonton, London
English footballers
English Football League players
Sheffield Wednesday F.C. players
Tottenham Hotspur F.C. players
Ton Pentre F.C. players
Association football defenders